Ralfsiales is an order of crustose brown algae (class Phaeophyceae) containing two families.

References

External links 
 Algae Base

 
Brown algae orders